Volta is a station of the Brescia Metro, in the city of Brescia in northern Italy.

The station is located at the junction between Via Lamarmora, Via Cremona and Via della Volta.

Connecting buses
 2 - Pendolina - Urago Mella - Volturno - Centro - BS2 - Fiera Chiesanuova
 13 - Gussago - Cellatica - Torricella - Cantore - Ugoni - Stazione - Corsica - Lamarmora - Poliambulanza

References

External links

Brescia Metro stations
Railway stations opened in 2013
2013 establishments in Italy
Railway stations in Italy opened in the 21st century